Earwolf is an American comedy podcasting network founded by Scott Aukerman and Jeff Ullrich in August 2010. In 2011, they announced a partnership with Funny Or Die. It merged with podcast advertising network The Mid Roll in 2014, a separate company founded by Ullrich, to form Midroll Media. Midroll was acquired by the E. W. Scripps Company in 2015. In July 2020, Sirius XM acquired Midroll Media, which includes Stitcher Radio and Earwolf, for $325 million.

Initially built around the Comedy Death-Ray Radio podcast, the network has since grown to include many podcasts on diverse subjects. The Earwolf studios are in Los Angeles, California, United States.

Comedy programming 

  Affirmation Nation with Bob Ducca 
A self-improvement podcast hosted by Seth Morris as his character Bob Ducca.

  Analyze Phish 
On Analyze Phish, Harris Wittels attempted to convince Scott Aukerman to like the band Phish. The first episode aired in August 2011. Ten episodes aired, with the final installment, "Fuego," posted on July 10, 2014.

  The Andy Daly Podcast Pilot Project 
A podcast where Andy Daly and Matt Gourley sort through various podcast pilots that have been sent to Earwolf.

  The Apple Sisters 
A mostly scripted podcast featuring The Apple Sisters. The show features original songs and stars three singing sisters who set their act in 1943.

 Attitudes!

In Attitudes!, formerly known as Throwing Shade, hosts Erin Gibson and Bryan Safi discuss issues concerning women's rights, LGBTQ rights and progressive politics laced with humor. They also consider important issues like grocery shopping, cotton candy grapes, annoying neighbors, and skin care.

  Bitch Sesh: A Real Housewives Breakdown 
A podcast where Casey Wilson and Danielle Schneider discuss shows from The Real Housewives franchise. They often have special guests, who have previously included Andy Cohen, June Diane Raphael, Michael Rapaport, Adam Pally, and Retta.

 Big Grande Teachers' Lounge
Big Grande Teachers Lounge ran from September 2017 to June 2020 and featured Drew Tarver, Dan Lippert, Jon Mackey, and Ryan Rosenberg as bumbling teachers at the fictional Hamilton High School.

 Bonanas for Bonanza
Launched in April 2020, Bonanas for Bonanza is the first podcast picked up by Earwolf from The Andy Daly Podcast Pilot Project. Hosts Dalton Wilcox (Andy Daly), Amy Sleeverson (Maria Bamford), and Mutt Taylor (Matt Gourley) watch the television show Bonanza.

  Comedy Bang! Bang!: The Podcast 

Comedy Bang Bang (previously Comedy Death-Ray Radio) is Earwolf's flagship podcast. It is hosted by Scott Aukerman and was originally an extension of his weekly live Comedy Death-Ray show. The weekly podcast features guests from the world of comedy, including Paul F. Tompkins, James Adomian, Tim Heidecker, Bob Odenkirk, and others. The show is known for improvised conversations between Aukerman and his guests, some of whom perform impressions or original characters. The show celebrated its two-year anniversary during its May 2 show and changed its name to Comedy Bang Bang: The Podcast. The A.V. Club listed the show as one of the top comedy podcasts of 2010.

In 2012, IFC began airing a television version of the show, called Comedy Bang! Bang! The first season ran for ten episodes, it was renewed for a 20 episode second season, and began airing its third season in May 2014. IFC picked up the show for a 40 episode fourth season on March 20, 2014. The series lasted for a total of five seasons.

  Conan O'Brien Needs a Friend

Launched in 2018, Conan O'Brien Needs a Friend is a podcast in which late-night television host Conan O'Brien hangs out with "people he enjoys most" and tries to find "real friendship" along the way.

  Cyber Thug Radio 
Cyber Thug Radio was a part of Earwolf for two weeks before being discontinued. It was hosted by Jerry Minor (as "Cyber Thug") with co-host "Miles Archer". Together they talked about hip-hop, athletics, and other urban topics. It launched in November 2010 and was formally announced canceled on December 28, 2010. The Earwolf store released a special third episode in March 2012.

  Dr. Gameshow 
A podcast where Jo Firestone and Manolo Moreno play listener-submitted games with comedian friends and listener call-ins. The podcast was on Earwolf from 2017 to 2018, but now can be found on Maximum Fun.

  Eardrop 
On March 14, 2011, Earwolf premiered Eardrop. Calling it an "Audio Twitter", Eardrop features a collection of comedians calling and leaving messages to an Earwolf answering machine, and those message then being played with sound effects between.

  Earwolf Challenge 
Billed as "America's first reality podcast", the Earwolf Challenge premiered July 11, 2011, and follows ten podcasts through a reality television-style elimination competition to win a year-long contract with Earwolf. The show is hosted by Matt Besser. It was won by the Totally Laime podcast, hosted by the Los Angeles-based husband and wife duo of Elizabeth Laime and Andy Rosen. After attracting few listeners, Earwolf Challenge is not returning for a second season.

  Earwolf Presents 
Earwolf Presents showcases new podcasts from Earwolf as well as one-off specials.

  Fake the Nation 
A podcast where Negin Farsad discusses politics with her funny friends.

  The Fogelnest Files 
Jake Fogelnest brings on a guest to discuss YouTube videos.

  Get Played 

Formerly known as 'How Did This Get Played?', Get Played is a podcast hosted by Nick Wiger and Heather Anne Campbell where they discuss poorly reviewed and badly designed video games.

  Glitter in the Garbage with Drew Droege 
Hosted by Drew Droege of Planet Unicorn and launched on December 7, 2010, Glitter in the Garbage is "a celebration of all thing fancy" that takes the shape of improvised sketches and monologues with Droege and his guests playing "obscure celebrities who celebrate, fight, feast upon, and polish the filth." Notable guests have included Saturday Night Live alums Melanie Hutsell, Michaela Watkins, and Casey Wilson; comedians James Adomian, June Diane Raphael and Groundlings member Stephanie Courtney who is best known for playing Flo in the Progressive Insurance commercials.

  Hard Nation 
A politics-themed comedy podcast hosted by Mike Still and Paul Welsh featuring comedians impersonating famous politicians. Splitsider called Hard Nation the "Best Political Comedy Podcast" of the 2016 U.S. presidential election. The show came to an end in March 2018, under the narrative auspices that Jeff Foxworthy had purchased their fictional radio station.

  Hello From The Magic Tavern 

Featuring Adal Rifai, Arnie Niekamp, and Matt Young, Hello From The Magic Tavern follows the story of Arnie Niekamp, who falls through a dimensional portal into the magical land of Foon. He uploads a podcast each week from the land's tavern the Vermilion Minotaur.

  Hollywood Handbook 

Hollywood Handbook is a podcast about learning and growing and having fun with your friends, hosted by comedian/writer duo The Boys, which consists of Hayes Davenport and Sean Clements. The show is supposed to mimic and mock reality programs that deal with trivial celebrity gossip and making it in Hollywood.  The hosts go on long tangential riffs about show-biz and Hollywood. Each week they have a guest for an interview, preceding the interview there are comedy segments in which Davenport and Clements discuss different things in their highly satirical fashion. Guests have included Donald Glover, Ellie Kemper, Aubrey Plaza, Kumail Nanjiani, Nick Kroll, Pauly Shore, and Sharon Horgan.

  The Hooray Show with Horatio 
A podcast featuring sketches and interviews with host Horatio Sanz. The Hooray Show left Earwolf after 26 episodes.

  How Did This Get Made? 

How Did This Get Made? hosted by Paul Scheer, June Diane Raphael and Jason Mantzoukas is a biweekly podcast. Each show, which has a new guest, features the deconstruction and mockery of terrible films. Not only are jokes made, but attempts to unscramble plots are often begun before being abandoned. During the show's off week a ".5" episode is uploaded featuring Scheer announcing the next week's movie as well as challenges for the fans.

 Inside Conan: An Important Hollywood Podcast
Late Night with Conan O'Brien writers Mike Sweeney and Jessie Gaskell offer a behind the scenes look at production on Late Night.

 improv4humans with Matt Besser
An improvised podcast led by Matt Besser, a founding member of the Upright Citizens Brigade. Besser and various improvisers use one-word suggestions from Twitter, listener calls, videos from YouTube, and occasional musical guests as basis for improvised scenes. Musical acts that have appeared on the podcast have included Frank Turner, Dan Deacon, Lucero, The Staves, The Family Crest, and more.

  Kevin Pollak's Chat Show 

Long-form interviews with luminaries from the worlds of comedy, film, and television, hosted by actor/comedian Kevin Pollak.

  Mike Detective 
A send up of hardboiled detective stories starring Rob Huebel as the metaphor spouting title character, Grey DeLisle as Stephanie Client and featuring Neil Campbell as the announcer. After premiering as a backdoor pilot during Comedy Death-Ray Radio, the first season lasted from January 4 to April 11, 2011.

  Nerd Poker: Dungeons & Dragons with Brian Posehn and Friends 

Comedian Brian Posehn hosted a weekly Dungeons & Dragons session, featuring stand-up comedians Blaine Capatch, Steve Agee, Dan Telfer, and actor Ken Daly. Guests (stand-in players) included Rick Remender and Dave Anthony. Original players who later moved on include Posehn's Deadpool co-writer Gerry Duggan, Sarah Guzzardo, and Scott "Mr. Sark" Robison. Nerd Poker has since left the network and become independent, with Guzzardo rejoining the regular cast.

  Never Not Funny 

A podcast featuring freeform conversations between Jimmy Pardo, Matt Belknap, and a guest. Never Not Funny joined Earwolf in January 2014.

  Off Book: The Improvised Musical 

In Off Book, Jessica McKenna, Zach Reino, and a guest improvise an entire musical in each episode.

  Pistol Shrimps Radio 
A podcast where Matt Gourley and Mark McConville give an absurdist running commentary on games played by the Los Angeles-based women's basketball team the Pistol Shrimps.

  Professor Blastoff 

The Professor Blastoff podcast premiered in May 2011 and finished in July 2015 after 217 episodes. Hosted by Tig Notaro, Kyle Dunnigan, and David Huntsberger. Professor Blastoff focused on science, philosophy, and humanities. They have had guests such as Sarah Silverman, Amy Schumer, Bill Burr and many more comedians. Other guests include Molly Ringwald and Taylor Dayne. Tig Notaro was suffering through breast cancer and the evolution of her career is mapped over the 4 years of the podcast's airing.

  Rafflecast 
A podcast hosted by Jon Daly where he does sketches and what he wants like making a song with Har Mar Superstar or calling Rob Huebel. Guests have included Honus Honus from Man Man, Brendon Small, Davin Wood of Heidecker And Wood, Doug Lussenhop, Adam Pally, Paul Scheer, Howard Kremer, Matt Besser, John Gemberling of Fat Guy Stuck in Internet, and Brian Huskey.

  Ronna & Beverly 

A podcast hosted by two characters — two Jewish women in their 50s. They often give unwanted advice to their guests.

 Scam Goddess
Host Laci Mosley and guests discuss scams, cons, robbery, and fraud. Topics have included Caroline Calloway, Fyre Fest, and Don Larpe.

Sklarbro Country
Sklarbro Country was the first show to be added to the Earwolf roster. It is hosted by Randy and Jason Sklar and is a sports-themed comedy program notably geared towards people that may not necessarily care about or follow sports. The brothers cover sports-related stories from around the world that normally would fall through the cracks of most sports news shows. In addition to The Sklars, voice actor Chris Cox often performs as various characters including Jerry Jones, Tiger Woods, Sam Elliott, and "Racist Vin Scully." Other characters are often played by Dan Van Kirk, James Adomian and Jason Nash. The show has featured a long list of famous guests, including Glenn Howerton and Kaitlin Olson from It's Always Sunny in Philadelphia, Jeffrey Ross, Patton Oswalt, and Jon Hamm, discussing specific sports stories or general themes of sports in the news. The title is a parody of Scarborough Country, a former opinion show on MSNBC hosted by former congressman Joe Scarborough.

The show ended when the Sklars migrated to Feral Audio in July 2017 and started Dumb People Town.

  Spontaneanation 

An improv podcast with host Paul F. Tompkins. Based upon an interview with a special guest, Tompkins and several "improvisational friends" (often co-stars from the Thrilling Adventure Hour or Superego podcasts, or co-stars from Tompkins' Seeso program Bajillion Dollar Propertie$) perform narrative improv set in a location provided by the guest.

  The Neighborhood Listen 
An improvised podcast hosted by Paul F. Tompkins and Nicole Parker, in the characters of Burnt Millipede and Joan Pedestrian, citizens of the fictional town of Dignity Falls. In each episode improvised comedy occurs based on posts from the neighborhood-based social network Nextdoor. Guests such as Maria Blasucci, Ryan Gaul, Nicole Byer, and Bobby Moynihan have all appeared as characters.

 Threedom
Co-hosts Lauren Lapkus, Paul F. Tompkins, and Scott Aukerman spend quality time together and discuss their lives.

  Topics 
Topics is a satirical podcast hosted by Michael Ian Black and Michael Showalter. The two Michaels play fictionalized versions of themselves, having overly pretentious conversations about serious subjects, such as "Does God Exist?" and "Gender".

  Totally Laime 
Elizabeth Laime and "Psychic" Andy Rosen interview comedians every week. The first episode aired in February 2010, and the last premiered in January 2015. Features The Oprah Game and Laime or Totally Rapid-fire.

  U Talkin' U2 To Me? / R U Talkin' R.E.M. RE: ME? / U Talkin' Talking Heads 2 My Talking Head?
The U Talkin series features Scott Aukerman and Adam Scott discussing their mutual admiration for an artist, discussing one album per episode. The podcast started as U Talkin' U2 to Me on February 26, 2014. Guests included Harris Wittels, Lance Bangs, Paul F. Tompkins, Jimmy Pardo, Todd Glass, Doug Benson, U2, Phoebe Robinson, and Andy Daly. In 2018, the podcast was rebranded as R U Talkin' R.E.M. RE: ME?, discussing the band R.E.M. In 2020, the podcast was again rebranded as R U Talkin' RHCP RE: ME?, discussing the band Red Hot Chili Peppers for one episode, where in  the second episode it was discussed that both hosts would much rather do a show about Talking Heads and was rebranded yet again as U Talkin' Talking Heads 2 My Talking Head?

 Voyage to the Stars
Voyage to the Stars is a comedic space exploration podcast featuring Felicia Day, Janet Varney, Steve Berg, and Colton Dunn.

 Who Charted?
Who Charted? launched on December 7, 2010, focus on pop culture by analyzing various film box office and record charts. Each week Howard Kremer, with former co-host Kulap Vilaysack (2010–2018), host a guest from the comedy or music field to review the week's charts and discuss their feelings on them. Towards the end of the episode the guest will play one of a variety of games.

  With Special Guest Lauren Lapkus 

A podcast where every week a new person assumes hosting duties and the guest is Lauren Lapkus as an original character.

  WOMP It Up! 

A "school project podcast" with Jessica St. Clair and Lennon Parham as their characters Marissa Wompler and Charlotte Listler.

 Lifestyle programming 

  Beautiful Anonymous 
A podcast formerly called  Beautiful Stories from Anonymous People where Chris Gethard speaks on the phone to anonymous people. The callers can hang up at any time, but Gethard must stay on the line with them for at least an hour.

 Best Friends with Nicole Byer and Sasheer Zamata
Comedians Nicole Byer and Sasheer Zamata discuss friendship, culture, and life.

 By the Way, In Conversation with Jeff Garlin
A live podcast recorded at Largo in LA, featuring a casual conversation between a guest and Jeff Garlin. Guests have included JJ Abrams, Henry Rollins, Lena Dunham, Will Ferrell, Zach Galifianakis and Larry David.

  The David Gregory Show 
An interview podcast hosted by David Gregory.

 Doing Great with Vicky Vox
Drag queen Vicky Vox interviews guests using tarot cards. Guests have included Detox, Alaska Thunderfuck, Bob the Drag Queen, and Betsy Sodaro.

  Homophilia

A podcast where Dave Holmes and Matt McConkey interview LGBT celebrities.

 I Weigh with Jameela Jamil

A bodypositive podcast where host Jameela Jamil interviews guests about identity and body image. Guests have included Billy Porter, Reese Witherspoon, and iO Tillett Wright.In Bed With Nick and Megan'''A podcast hosted by Nick Offerman and Megan Mullally, who record the podcast from their own bed and interview friends and celebrities while also discussing their careers and personal lives. It debuted in November 2019 and guests have included Retta, Lisa Kudrow, Bill Hader and Will Forte.

  Katie Couric 
An interview podcast hosted by Katie Couric.

  Kondabolu Brothers 
In Kondabolu Brothers, Ashok and Hari Kondabolu discuss cultural matters and pop culture.

  The Longest Shortest Time The Longest Shortest Time is a parenting podcast hosted by Hillary Frank.

  Love, Dad 
A parenting podcast hosted by Earwolf founder Jeff Ullrich and comedian/actor David Koechner.

  Question of the Day 
A podcast where Stephen J. Dubner and James Altucher answer a question every Tuesday, Wednesday, and Thursday.

  Seth Godin's Startup School 
A business podcast hosted by author and marketing guru Seth Godin.

  The Wolf Den 
A business and media podcast hosted by Lex Friedman and Chris Bannon (previously Adam Sachs and Jeff Ullrich), focusing on the business of podcasting and digital media.

  Yo, Is This Racist? 

A spin-off of the popular Tumblr blog of the same name, hosted by Andrew Ti.

 Queery with Cameron EpositoStandup comedian Cameron Esposito interviews LGBTQ+ celebrities, activists, and thinkers.

 Culture programming 

  The Black List Table Reads 
A podcast where The Black List founder Franklin Leonard presents unproduced scripts read by a rotating group of actors.

  The Canon 

In The Canon, Amy Nicholson and a different co-host (formerly Devin Faraci) discuss a new movie every week and whether it deserves to be "canon," though the final decision is left to listeners' votes.

  The Cracked Podcast 
Hosted by Alex Schmidt, The Cracked Podcast is an extension of the discussions that drive articles published on the website Cracked.

  Crybabies 
A podcast where Sarah Thyre, Susan Orlean, and a guest discuss what makes them cry.

 Culture KingsComedians Jacquis Neal and Edgar Momplaisir discuss blackness and popular culture. The podcast of was previously part of the iHeart Radio network but moved to Earwolf in January 2020.

  Denzel Washington Is The Greatest Actor Of All Time Period 

A podcast where W. Kamau Bell and Kevin Avery discuss a new movie starring Denzel Washington each week.

 Factually! with Adam ConoverComedian Adam Conover of Adam Ruins Everything and The G Word, interviews experts on science, politics, and current events.

 Full Release with Samantha BeeFull Frontal host Samantha Bee speaks with journalists and experts about current events and issues. Guests have included Jelani Cobb, Soledad O'Brien, and Dr. Jen Gunter.Get Up On ThisGet Up On This was a podcast that ran from November 2014 to February 2019, Jensen Karp and Matthew Robinson introduced listeners to TV shows, musicians, and other things they should be familiar with. Ali Segel and Erin Mallory Long took over as hosts of Get Up On This 2.0 in November 2019.

  Getting Curious with Jonathan Van Ness 
Jonathan Van Ness's podcast to discuss timely cultural topics with special guests such as Melinda Gates, Reese Witherspoon and Katie Couric, as well as Jonathan's co-hosts from Queer Eye.

  Happy Sad Confused 
An interview podcast where Josh Horowitz has conversations with actors and filmmakers.

 History: The ShequelHost Erin Gibson "is joined each week by a cool teen" to discuss women's history. Subjects have included Ida B. Wells, March Fong Eu, and Deborah Sampson.

  I Was There Too 
A podcast where Matt Gourley interviews people involved with some of the most famous movies and TV shows of all time.

  James Bonding 
A podcast where Matt Gourley and Matt Mira discuss the James Bond film series. The show has been on hiatus since January 2020.

  Maltin On Movies 
A podcast where Leonard Maltin and Baron Vaughn discuss films on a different theme each week. In July 2016, Maltin On Movies moved to Nerdist.

  How To Be Less Old 
In How To Be Less Old (formerly OMFG!), Emily Foster and Deanna Cheng educate themselves and others on youth culture.

  Raised By TV 
In Raised By TV, Jon Gabrus and Lauren Lapkus discuss the television from their childhoods.

  Reading Aloud 
A reading podcast where Nate Corddry plays host to live renditions of interesting works of literature.

  The Room Where It's HappeningIn The Room Where It's Happening, Travon Free and Mike Drucker bring on guests to discuss the musical Hamilton.

 Spanish Aquí PresentsSpanish Aquí Presents is a comedy podcast hosted by Oscar Montoya, Raiza Licea, Tony Rodriguez, and Carlos Santos.

 The Three Questions with Andy RichterAn interview podcast where Andy Richter asks guests three questions: where they come from, where they are going, and what they have learned.Office LadiesIn Office Ladies, best friends and former cast members of The Office Jenna Fischer and Angela Kinsey review past episodes of the show, providing behind the scenes information and answering fan questions.

 UnspooledUnspooled is a film podcast co-hosted by Amy Nicholson and Paul Scheer. Season 1 explores the AFI Top 100 while season 2 explores Scheer and Nicholson's top 100 films.

 We Called Your MomCo-hosted by Beth Stelling and her mother Diane, We Called Your Mom features interviews with the mothers of popular artists and comedians.

 Urgent Care with Joel Kim Booster and Mitra JouhariHosts Joel Kim Booster and Mitra Jouhari answer listener requests for relationship advice.

 Music programming 

  Nocturnal Emotions 
An interview podcast hosted by musician Har Mar Superstar.

  Shortwave 
An interview podcast hosted by musician Grant-Lee Phillips.

 Wolfpop 
In November 2014, Earwolf launched a sister network, Wolfpop, led by Paul Scheer. Wolfpop's podcast lineup included The Black List Table Reads, The Canon, Cardboard! With Rich Sommer, Crybabies, Denzel Washington Is The Greatest Actor Of All Time Period, Get Up on This, Happy Sad Confused, I Was There Too, Maltin on Movies, Nerd Machine's Picking Favorites, Off Camera, OMFG!, Reading Aloud, Rotten Tomatoes, and The Sylvester Stallone Show. On March 7, 2016, the majority of Wolfpop's programs were folded over into Earwolf.

 Howl 
Howl was a podcasting app launched by Midroll Media. The premium version of the app featured the entire back catalogues of Earwolf podcasts, as well as several comedy specials and all episodes of WTF with Marc Maron. Howl also featured many limited-run podcasts exclusive to the premium version of the app, including Atlas Obscura Day, I Know It Sounds Crazy, Colt Cabana Presents: The Gathering of the Juggalos, Good Question, Hardcore Game of Thrones, Psychic Pshow with Lauren Lapkus, Spalding Gray: Great Live Performances, Superego: Forgotten Classics, The Complete Woman, The Mysterious Secrets Of Uncle Bertie's Botanarium, What's Wrong With Me?, Wild Horses: The Perspective, and Words of the Years''. In 2019, Howl was discontinued, its programming still being available on Stitcher Premium.

References

External links 
 

 
 
2010 establishments in the United States
Organizations based in Los Angeles
Podcasting companies